NorthSouth Productions is a television production company in the United States that was founded by Charlie DeBevoise and Mark Hickman in 2000. NorthSouth creates and produces original programming for a variety of broadcast and cable networks including Peacock, HGTV, Discovery, TLC, History, A&E, MTV, VH1, SyFy, OWN: Oprah Winfrey Network, TruTV, WE tv, Discovery Health, Food Network, Lifetime, and the Sundance Channel. Their production credits include documentaries, reality television, travel series, and sports entertainment. The company has offices in New York City and Knoxville, Tennessee.

On December 6, 2012, it was announced that Hearst Corporation would take a 50% stake in NorthSouth. In 2016, Charlie DeBevoise bought out Mark Hickman of his stake in the company. DeBevoise now owns 50% of the company. In 2019, he formed NoSo Films to develop, produce, and finance long form documentaries.

Digital Graffiti is NorthSouth's full-service post-production facility.

List of programs produced
 Prank Academy - YouTube Red
 Impractical Jokers - truTV
 Say Yes to the Dress: Atlanta – TLC
 Say Yes to the Dress: Bridesmaids – TLC
 Double Divas - Lifetime (TV network)
 Bullet Points - Military Channel
 Lovetown, USA - Oprah Winfrey Network (U.S. TV channel)
 Hard Parts: South Bronx - Speed (TV network)
 You Don't Know Dixie – History 
 Marked – History 
 Wrecked: Life in the Crash Lane – Speed
 One Way Out – Discovery Channel
 Little Miss Perfect – WE tv
 Paranormal Cops – A&E
 Ugliest House on the Block – WE tv
 Getting Abroad – MOJO HD
 Big Spender – A&E
 Try My Life – Style Network
 What Makes it Tick? – Fine Living
 Fight Quest – Discovery Channel
 I Bet You – MOJO HD
 Bride vs. Bride – WE tv
 In a Fix – TLC
 Million Dollar Agents (2005) – TLC
 A Wedding Story – TLC
 Get Packing – Travel Channel
 Make Room for Baby – Discovery Health

References

External links

Digital Graffiti

Television production companies of the United States
Hearst Communications assets
American companies established in 2000
Mass media companies established in 2000